The 1988 Western Kentucky Hilltoppers football team represented Western Kentucky University in the 1988 NCAA Division I-AA football season and were led by head coach Dave Roberts. The team earned their second consecutive NCAA Division I-AA playoff berth, making it to the quarterfinals. The Hilltoppers finished the season ranked 13th in the final national poll.

Western Kentucky's roster included future National Football League (NFL) players Tony Brown, Eddie Godfrey, Anthony Green, Jerome Martin, Xavier Jordan, Dean Tiebout, Jonathan Watts, and Riley Ware. Joe Arnold, Tiebout, and Dewayne Penn were named to the AP All American team.

Schedule

References

Western Kentucky
Western Kentucky Hilltoppers football seasons
Western Kentucky Hilltoppers football